Yuanli Township is an urban township in southwestern Miaoli County, Taiwan, occupying an area of , with a population of 43,923 in January 2023. Yuanli is known as "Miaoli's Granary."

Economy
Earlier, the main activities of the township is the production of mats, hats and hand-made woven products. However, nowadays those industries have declined due to the abundance of equivalent cheap goods.

Currently the main economic activities of the township is rice cultivation, where 3,000 hectares of the township land is made up of rice fields.

 Yuanli Tsai's Old House

References

External links

Taichung Irrigation Association

Townships in Miaoli County
Taiwan placenames originating from Formosan languages